Oluwasegun Atere (born 2 November 1985) is a Nigerian football midfielder currently playing for Giwa FC.

Career
He began his career with hometown Shooting Stars's feeder team in 2000 before joining the main team. In July 2003 he joined Jupiler League side K.A.A. Gent in a two-year deal. In January 2005, he moved to Belgian lower league team K.F.C. Evergem-Center on loan. He played 2 years and 6 months with the team before moving back to his home country and signing with Kwara United F.C. He signed with NPFL debutants Giwa FC in 2014.

International career
Atere played on the Golden Eaglets squad that won the African U-17 Championship gold medal in Seychelles in 2001. He was also on the national U-20 in 2002 while he was in El-Kanemi and was on the runner-up U-23 team at the 2003 All Africa games hosted by Nigeria.

References

1985 births
Living people
Nigerian footballers
Association football midfielders
K.A.A. Gent players
Kwara United F.C. players
El-Kanemi Warriors F.C. players
Yoruba sportspeople
Giwa F.C. players
Sportspeople from Ibadan